Elizabeth Ann Warren (née Herring; born June 22, 1949) is an American politician and former law professor who is the senior United States senator from Massachusetts, serving since 2013. A member of the Democratic Party and regarded as a progressive, Warren has focused on consumer protection, equitable economic opportunity, and the social safety net while in the Senate. Warren was a candidate in the 2020 Democratic Party presidential primaries, ultimately finishing third.

Born and raised in Oklahoma, Warren is a graduate of the University of Houston and Rutgers Law School and has taught law at several universities, including the University of Houston, the University of Texas at Austin, the University of Pennsylvania, and Harvard University. She was one of the most influential professors in commercial and bankruptcy law before beginning her political career. Warren has written 12 books and more than 100 articles.

Warren's first foray into public policy began in 1995, when she worked to oppose what eventually became a 2005 act restricting bankruptcy access for individuals. During the late 2000s, her national profile grew after her forceful public stances in favor of more stringent banking regulations after the financial crisis of 2007–08. She served as chair of the Congressional Oversight Panel of the Troubled Asset Relief Program, and proposed and established the Consumer Financial Protection Bureau, for which she served as the first special advisor under President Barack Obama.

In 2012, Warren defeated incumbent Republican Scott Brown and became the first female U.S. senator from Massachusetts. She won re-election by a wide margin in 2018, defeating Republican nominee Geoff Diehl. On February 9, 2019, Warren announced her candidacy in the 2020 United States presidential election. She was briefly considered the front-runner for the Democratic nomination in late 2019, but support for her campaign dwindled. She withdrew from the race on March 5, 2020, after Super Tuesday.

Early life and education 

Warren was born Elizabeth Ann Herring in Oklahoma City on June 22, 1949. She is the fourth child of Pauline Louise (née Reed, 1912–1995), a homemaker, and Donald Jones Herring (1911–1997), a U.S. Army flight instructor during World War II, both of whom were members of the evangelical branch of the Protestant Methodist Church. Warren has described her early family life as teetering "on the ragged edge of the middle class" and "kind of hanging on at the edges by our fingernails." She and her three older brothers were raised Methodist.

Warren lived in Norman, Oklahoma, until she was 11 years old, when her family moved back to Oklahoma City. When she was 12, her father, then a salesman at Montgomery Ward, had a heart attack, which led to many medical bills as well as a pay cut because he could not do his previous work. After leaving his sales job, he worked as a maintenance man for an apartment building. Eventually, the family's car was repossessed because they failed to make loan payments. To help the family finances, her mother found work in the catalog-order department at Sears. When she was 13, Warren started waiting tables at her aunt's restaurant.

Warren became a star member of the debate team at Northwest Classen High School and won the state high school debating championship. She also won a debate scholarship to George Washington University (GWU) at the age of 16. She initially aspired to be a teacher, but left GWU after two years in 1968 to marry James Robert "Jim" Warren, whom she had met in high school.

Warren and her husband moved to Houston, where he was employed by IBM. She enrolled in the University of Houston and graduated in 1970 with a Bachelor of Science degree in speech pathology and audiology.

The Warrens moved to New Jersey when Jim received a job transfer. She soon became pregnant and decided to stay at home to care for their daughter, Amelia. After Amelia turned two, Warren enrolled at Rutgers Law School. She received her Juris Doctor in 1976 and passed the bar examination shortly thereafter. Shortly before graduating, Warren became pregnant with their second child, Alexander.

Career
In 1970, after obtaining a degree in speech pathology and audiology, but before enrolling in law school, Warren taught children with disabilities for a year in a public school. During law school, she worked as a summer associate at Cadwalader, Wickersham & Taft. After receiving her Juris Doctor and passing the bar examination, Warren offered legal services from home, writing wills and doing real estate closings.

In the late 1970s, 1980s, and 1990s, Warren taught law at several American universities while researching issues related to bankruptcy and middle-class personal finance. She became involved with public work in bankruptcy regulation and consumer protection in the mid-1990s.

Academic

Warren began her career in academia as a lecturer at Rutgers University, Newark School of Law (1977–1978). She then moved to the University of Houston Law Center (1978–1983), where she became an associate dean in 1980 and obtained tenure in 1981. She taught at the University of Texas School of Law as visiting associate professor in 1981 and returned as a full professor two years later (staying from 1983 to 1987). She was a research associate at the Population Research Center of the University of Texas at Austin from 1983 to 1987 and was also a visiting professor at the University of Michigan in 1985. During this period, Warren also taught Sunday school.

Warren's earliest academic work was heavily influenced by the law and economics movement, which aimed to apply neoclassical economic theory to the study of law with an emphasis on economic efficiency. One of her articles, published in 1980 in the Notre Dame Law Review, argued that public utilities were over-regulated and that automatic utility rate increases should be instituted. But Warren soon became a proponent of on-the-ground research into how people respond to laws. Her work analyzing court records and interviewing judges, lawyers, and debtors, established her as a rising star in the field of bankruptcy law. According to Warren and economists who follow her work, one of her key insights was that rising bankruptcy rates were caused not by profligate consumer spending but by middle-class families' attempts to buy homes in good school districts. Warren worked in this field alongside colleagues Teresa A. Sullivan and Jay Westbrook, and the trio published their research in the book As We Forgive Our Debtors in 1989. Warren later recalled that she had begun her research believing that most people filing for bankruptcy were either working the system or had been irresponsible in incurring debts, but that she concluded that such abuse was in fact rare and that the legal framework for bankruptcy was poorly designed, describing the way the research challenged her fundamental beliefs as "worse than disillusionment" and "like being shocked at a deep-down level". In 2004, she published an article in the Washington University Law Review in which she argued that correlating middle-class struggles with over-consumption was a fallacy.

Warren joined the University of Pennsylvania Law School as a full professor in 1987 and obtained an endowed chair in 1990, becoming the William A. Schnader Professor of Commercial Law. In 1992, she taught for a year at Harvard Law School as Robert Braucher Visiting Professor of Commercial Law. In 1995, Warren left Penn to become Leo Gottlieb Professor of Law at Harvard Law School. In 1996, she became the highest-paid professor at Harvard University who was not an administrator, with a $181,300 salary and total compensation of $291,876, including moving expenses and an allowance in lieu of benefits contributions. , she was Harvard's only tenured law professor who had attended law school at an American public university. Warren was a highly influential law professor. She published in many fields, but her expertise was in bankruptcy and commercial law. From 2005 to 2009, Warren was among the three most-cited scholars in those fields.

She began to rise in prominence in 2004 with an appearance on the Dr. Phil show, and published several books including The Two-Income Trap.

Advisory roles
In 1995, the National Bankruptcy Review Commission's chair, former congressman Mike Synar, asked Warren to advise the commission. Synar had been a debate opponent of Warren's during their school years. She helped draft the commission's report and worked for several years to oppose legislation intended to severely restrict consumers' right to file for bankruptcy. Warren and others opposing the legislation were not successful; in 2005, Congress passed the Bankruptcy Abuse Prevention and Consumer Protection Act of 2005, which curtailed consumers' ability to file for bankruptcy.

From 2006 to 2010, Warren was a member of the FDIC (Federal Deposit Insurance Corporation) Advisory Committee on Economic Inclusion. She is a member of the National Bankruptcy Conference, an independent organization that advises the U.S. Congress on bankruptcy law, a former vice president of the American Law Institute and a member of the American Academy of Arts and Sciences.

Warren's scholarship and public advocacy were the impetus for establishing the Consumer Financial Protection Bureau in 2011.

TARP oversight

On November 14, 2008, U.S. Senate majority leader Harry Reid appointed Warren to chair the five-member Congressional Oversight Panel created to oversee the implementation of the Emergency Economic Stabilization Act. The panel released monthly oversight reports evaluating the government bailout and related programs. During Warren's tenure, these reports covered foreclosure mitigation, consumer and small business lending, commercial real estate, AIG, bank stress tests, the impact of the Troubled Asset Relief Program (TARP) on the financial markets, government guarantees, the automotive industry and other topics.

Consumer Financial Protection Bureau

Warren was an early advocate for creating a new Consumer Financial Protection Bureau (CFPB). The bureau was established by the Dodd–Frank Wall Street Reform and Consumer Protection Act, signed into law by President Obama in July 2010. In September 2010, Obama named Warren Assistant to the President and Special Advisor to the Secretary of the Treasury on the CFPB to set up the new agency. While liberal groups and consumer advocacy groups urged Obama to formally nominate Warren as the agency's director, financial institutions and Republican members of Congress strongly opposed her, believing she would be an overly zealous regulator. Reportedly convinced that Warren could not win Senate confirmation as the bureau's first director, in January 2012, Obama appointed former Ohio attorney general Richard Cordray to the post in a recess appointment over Republican senators' objections.

Political affiliation
A close high-school friend told Politico in 2019 that in high school Warren was a "diehard conservative" and that she had since done a "180-degree turn and an about-face". One of her colleagues at the University of Texas in Austin said that at university in the early 1980s Warren was "sometimes surprisingly anti-consumer in her attitude". Gary L. Francione, who had been a colleague of hers at the University of Pennsylvania, recalled in 2019 that when he heard her speak at the time she was becoming politically prominent, he "almost fell off [his] chair... She's definitely changed". Warren was registered as a Republican from 1991 to 1996 and voted Republican for many years. "I was a Republican because I thought that those were the people who best supported markets", she has said. But she has also said that in the six presidential elections before 1996 she voted for the Republican nominee only once, in 1976, for Gerald Ford.

Warren has said that she began to vote Democratic in 1995 because she no longer believed that the Republicans were the party who best supported markets, but she has said she has voted for both parties because she believed neither should dominate. According to Warren, she left the Republican Party because it is no longer "principled in its conservative approach to economics and to markets" and is instead tilting the playing field in favor of large financial institutions and against middle-class American families.

U.S. Senate (2013–present)

Elections

2012

On September 14, 2011, Warren declared her intention to run for the Democratic nomination for the 2012 election in Massachusetts for the U.S. Senate. Republican Scott Brown had won the seat in a 2010 special election after Ted Kennedy's death. A week later, a video of Warren speaking in Andover went viral on the Internet. In it, Warren responds to the charge that asking the rich to pay more taxes is "class warfare" by saying that no one grew rich in the U.S. without depending on infrastructure paid for by the rest of society:

President Obama later echoed her sentiments in a 2012 election campaign speech.

Warren ran unopposed for the Democratic nomination and won it on June 2, 2012, at the state Democratic convention with a record 95.77% of the votes of delegates. She encountered significant opposition from business interests. In August, the political director for the U.S. Chamber of Commerce commented that "no other candidate in 2012 represents a greater threat to free enterprise than Professor Warren". Warren nonetheless raised $39 million for her campaign, more than any other Senate candidate in 2012, and showed, according to The New York Times, "that it was possible to run against the big banks without Wall Street money and still win".

Warren received a prime-time speaking slot at the 2012 Democratic National Convention on September 5, 2012. She positioned herself as a champion of a beleaguered middle class that "has been chipped, squeezed, and hammered". According to Warren, "People feel like the system is rigged against them. And here's the painful part: They're right. The system is rigged." Warren said Wall Street CEOs "wrecked our economy and destroyed millions of jobs" and that they "still strut around congress, no shame, demanding favors, and acting like we should thank them".

2018

On January 6, 2017, in an email to supporters, Warren announced that she would be running for a second term as a U.S. senator from Massachusetts, writing, "The people of Massachusetts didn't send me to Washington to roll over and play dead while Donald Trump and his team of billionaires, bigots, and Wall Street bankers crush the working people of our Commonwealth and this country. ... This is no time to quit."

In the 2018 election, Warren defeated Republican nominee Geoff Diehl, 60% to 36%.

Tenure
On November 6, 2012, Warren defeated Brown with 53.7% of the vote. She is the first woman ever elected to the U.S. Senate from Massachusetts, as part of a sitting U.S. Senate that had 20 women senators in office, which was the most in Senate history at the time, following the November 2012 elections. In December 2012, Warren was assigned a seat on the Senate Banking Committee, which oversees the implementation of Dodd–Frank and other regulation of the banking industry. Vice President Joe Biden swore Warren in on January 3, 2013.

At Warren's first Banking Committee hearing in February 2013, she pressed several banking regulators to say when they had last taken a Wall Street bank to trial and said, "I'm really concerned that 'too big to fail' has become 'too big for trial'." Videos of Warren's questioning amassed more than one million views in a matter of days. At a March Banking Committee hearing, Warren asked Treasury Department officials why criminal charges were not brought against HSBC for its money laundering practices. Warren compared money laundering to drug possession, saying: "If you're caught with an ounce of cocaine, the chances are good you're going to go to jail ... But evidently, if you launder nearly a billion dollars for drug cartels and violate our international sanctions, your company pays a fine and you go home and sleep in your own bed at night."

In May 2013, Warren sent letters to the Justice Department, the Securities and Exchange Commission, and the Federal Reserve questioning their decisions that settling would be more fruitful than going to court. Also in May, saying that students should get "the same great deal that banks get", Warren introduced the Bank on Student Loans Fairness Act, which would allow students to take out government education loans at the same rate that banks pay to borrow from the federal government, 0.75%. Independent senator Bernie Sanders endorsed her bill, saying: "The only thing wrong with this bill is that [she] thought of it and I didn't".

During the 2014 election cycle, Warren was a top Democratic fundraiser. After the election, Warren was appointed to become the first-ever Strategic Adviser of the Democratic Policy and Communications Committee, a position created for her. The appointment added to speculation that Warren would run for president in 2016.

In early 2015, President Obama urged Congress to approve the Trans-Pacific Partnership, a proposed free trade agreement between the United States and 11 Asian and South American countries. Warren criticized the TPP, arguing that the dispute resolution mechanism in the agreement and labor protections for American workers therein were insufficient; her objections were in turn criticized by Obama.

Saying "despite the progress we've made since 2008, the biggest banks continue to threaten our economy", in July 2015 Warren, John McCain, Maria Cantwell, and Angus King reintroduced the 21st Century Glass–Steagall Act, a modern version of the Banking Act of 1933. The legislation was intended to reduce the American taxpayer's risk in the financial system and the likelihood of future financial crises.

In a September 20, 2016, hearing, Warren called on Wells Fargo CEO John Stumpf to resign, adding that he should be "criminally investigated" over Wells Fargo's opening of two million checking and credit-card accounts without the customers' consent.

In December 2016, Warren gained a seat on the Senate Armed Services Committee, which The Boston Globe called "a high-profile perch on one of the chamber's most powerful committees" that would "fuel speculation about a possible 2020 bid for president".

During the debate on Senator Jeff Sessions's nomination for United States attorney general in February 2017, Warren quoted a letter Coretta Scott King had written Senator Strom Thurmond in 1986 when Sessions was nominated for a federal judgeship. King wrote, "Mr. Sessions has used the awesome power of his office to chill the free exercise of the vote by black citizens in the district he now seeks to serve as a federal judge. This simply cannot be allowed to happen." Senate Republicans voted that by reading the letter from King, Warren had violated Senate Rule 19, which prohibits impugning another senator's character. This prohibited Warren from further participating in the debate on Sessions's nomination, and Warren instead read King's letter while streaming live online. In rebuking Warren, Senate Majority Leader Mitch McConnell said on the Senate floor, "She was warned. She was given an explanation. Nevertheless, she persisted." McConnell's language became a slogan for Warren and others.

On October 3, 2017, during Wells Fargo chief executive Timothy J. Sloan's appearance before the Senate Banking Committee, Warren called on him to resign, saying, "At best you were incompetent, at worst you were complicit."

On July 17, 2019, Warren and Representative Al Lawson introduced legislation that would make low-income college students eligible for benefits under the Supplemental Nutrition Assistance Program (SNAP) according to the College Student Hunger Act of 2019.

In November 2020, Warren was named a candidate for Secretary of the Treasury in the Biden Administration.

Warren was at the Capitol to participate in the 2021 United States Electoral College vote count when Trump supporters attacked the Capitol. She called it an "attempted coup and act of insurrection egged on by a corrupt president to overthrow our democracy", and the perpetrators "domestic terrorists." The day after the attack, Warren joined the entire Massachusetts Congressional delegation to call for Trump's immediate removal from office through the invocation of the Twenty-fifth Amendment to the United States Constitution or impeachment.

Role in the 2016 presidential election

In the run-up to the 2016 United States presidential election, supporters put Warren forward as a possible presidential candidate, but she repeatedly said she would not run for president in 2016. In October 2013, she joined the other 15 women Democratic senators in signing a letter that encouraged Hillary Clinton to run. There was much speculation about Warren being added to the Democratic ticket as a vice-presidential candidate. On June 9, 2016, after the California Democratic primary, Warren formally endorsed Clinton for president. In response to questions when she endorsed Clinton, Warren said that she believed herself to be ready to be vice president, but she was not being vetted. On July 7, CNN reported that Warren was on a five-person short list to be Clinton's running mate. Clinton eventually chose Tim Kaine.

Until her June endorsement, Warren was neutral during the Democratic primary but made public statements that she was cheering Bernie Sanders on. In June, Warren endorsed and campaigned for Clinton. She called Donald Trump, the presumptive Republican nominee, dishonest, uncaring, and "a loser".

Committee assignments

Current
 Committee on Armed Services
 Subcommittee on Emerging Threats and Capabilities
 Subcommittee on Personnel (chair)
 Subcommittee on Strategic Forces
 Committee on Banking, Housing, and Urban Affairs
 Subcommittee on Economic Policy (chair)
 Subcommittee on Financial Institutions and Consumer Protection 
 Subcommittee on Securities, Insurance, and Investment
 Committee on Finance
 Subcommittee on Fiscal Responsibility and Economic Growth (chair)
 Subcommittee on Health Care
 Subcommittee on Taxation and IRS Oversight
 Special Committee on Aging

Previous
 Committee on Energy and Natural Resources (2015-2017)
 Committee on Health, Education, Labor and Pensions (2013-2021)

2020 presidential campaign

At a town hall meeting in Holyoke, Massachusetts, on September 29, 2018, Warren said she would "take a hard look" at running for president in the 2020 election after the 2018 United States elections concluded. On December 31, 2018, Warren announced that she was forming an exploratory committee to run for president.

On February 9, 2019, Warren officially announced her candidacy at a rally in Lawrence, Massachusetts, at the site of the 1912 Bread and Roses strike. A longtime critic of President Trump, Warren called him a "symptom of a larger problem [that has resulted in] a rigged system that props up the rich and powerful and kicks dirt on everyone else".

Warren staged her first campaign event in Lawrence to demonstrate the constituency groups she hopes to appeal to, including working class families, union members, women, and new immigrants. She called for major changes in government:

Following her candidacy announcement, Warren released several policy proposals, including plans to assist family farms by addressing the advantages held by large agricultural conglomerates, plans to reduce student loan debt and offer free tuition at public colleges, a plan to make large corporations pay more in taxes and better regulate large technology companies, and plans to address opioid addiction. She has introduced an "Economic Patriotism" plan intended to create opportunities for American workers, and proposals inspired by opposition to President Trump, including one that would make it permissible to indict a sitting president.

One of her signature plans was a wealth tax, dubbed the "Ultra-Millionaire Tax," on fortunes over $50,000,000. Warren was credited with popularizing the idea of a wealth tax with Americans, leading competitor Bernie Sanders to release a wealth tax plan.

Warren became known for the number and depth of her policy proposals. On her campaign website, she detailed more than 45 plans for topics including health care, universal child care, ending the opioid crisis, clean energy, climate change, foreign policy, reducing corporate influence at the Pentagon, and ending "Wall Street's stranglehold on the economy".

On March 5, 2020, she ended her campaign.

Polls

In early June 2019, Warren placed second in some polls, with Joe Biden in first place and Bernie Sanders in third. In the following weeks her poll numbers steadily increased, and a September Iowa poll placed her in the lead with 22% to Biden's 20%. The Iowa poll also rated the number of voters at least considering voting for each candidate; Warren scored 71% to Biden's 60%. Poll respondents also gave her a higher "enthusiasm" rating, with 32% of her backers extremely enthusiastic to Biden's 22%.

An October 24 Quinnipiac poll placed Warren in the lead at 28%, with Biden at 21% and Sanders at 15%. When asked which candidate had the best policy ideas, 30% of respondents named Warren, with Sanders at 20% and Biden 15%. Sanders was most often named as the candidate who "cares most about people like you," with Warren in second place and Biden third. Sanders also placed first at 28% when respondents were asked which candidate was the most honest, followed by Warren and Biden at 15% each.

Funding

The Los Angeles Times reported that of the front-runners in the presidential race, only Sanders and Warren have previously won an election with almost exclusively small online contributions, and that no presidential primary in recent history has had two of the top three candidates refuse to use bundlers or hold private fundraisers with wealthy donors.

In January 2019, Warren said that she took no PAC money. In October 2019, Warren announced that her campaign would not accept contributions of more than $200 from executives at banks, large tech companies, private equity firms, or hedge funds, in addition to her previous refusal to accept donations of over $200 from fossil fuel or pharmaceutical executives.

In the third quarter of 2019 Warren's campaign raised $24.6 million, just less than the $25.3 million Sanders's campaign raised and well ahead of Joe Biden, the front-runner in the polls, who raised $15.2 million. Warren's average donation was $26; Sanders's was $18.

In February 2020, Warren began accepting support from Super PACs, after failing to convince other Democratic presidential candidates to join her in disavowing them.

Public appearances

As of September 2019, Warren had attended 128 town halls. She is known for remaining afterward to talk with audience members and for the large numbers of selfies she has taken with them. On September 17, over 20,000 people attended a Warren rally at New York City's Washington Square Park. After her speech long lines formed with people waiting as long as four hours for selfies.

Due to the impeachment trial of Donald Trump, Warren was unable to make final campaign stops in person and opted to send her dog, Bailey Warren, to meet with voters in Iowa.

Vice-presidential speculation
In June 2020, CNN reported that Warren was among the top four vice-presidential choices for Joe Biden, the presumptive Democratic presidential nominee, along with Mayor Keisha Lance Bottoms, Representative Val Demings, and Senator Kamala Harris. Kamala Harris was officially announced as Biden's running mate on August 11, 2020. On August 13, The New York Times reported that Warren was one of Biden's four finalists along with Harris, Susan Rice, and Gretchen Whitmer.

In late April, CNBC reported that big-money donors were pressuring Biden not to choose Warren, preferring other candidates purportedly on his list, such as Harris, Whitmer, and Amy Klobuchar.

Personal life 
Warren and her first husband divorced in 1978, and two years later, Warren married law professor Bruce H. Mann on July 12, 1980, but kept her first husband's surname. Warren has three grandchildren through her daughter Amelia.

On April 23, 2020, Warren announced on Twitter that her eldest brother, Don Reed Herring, had died of COVID-19 two days earlier. On October 1, 2021, she announced that her brother, John Herring, had died of cancer.

As of 2019, according to Forbes Magazine, Warren's net worth was $12 million.

Political positions

Warren is widely regarded as a progressive. In 2012, the British magazine New Statesman named Warren among the "top 20 U.S. progressives".

Warren supports worker representation on corporations' board of directors, breaking up monopolies, stiffening sentences for white-collar crime, a Medicare for All plan to provide health insurance for all Americans, and a higher minimum wage.

Warren was highly critical of the Trump administration. She expressed concerns over what she says were Trump's conflicts of interest. The Presidential Conflicts of Interest Act, written by Warren, was first read in the Senate in January 2017. Warren was highly critical of Trump's immigration policies. In 2018, she called for abolishing U.S. Immigration and Customs Enforcement (ICE).

Warren has criticized U.S. involvement in the Saudi Arabian-led intervention in Yemen in support of Yemen's government against the Houthis. In January 2019, Warren criticized Trump's decision to withdraw U.S. troops from Syria and Afghanistan. She agreed that U.S. troops should be withdrawn from Syria and Afghanistan but said such withdrawals should be part of a "coordinated" plan formed with U.S. allies.

In April 2019, after reading the Mueller report, Warren called on the House of Representatives to begin impeachment proceedings against Trump, saying, "The Mueller report lays out facts showing that a hostile foreign government attacked our 2016 election to help Donald Trump and Donald Trump welcomed that help. Once elected, Donald Trump obstructed the investigation into that attack."

After the June 24, 2022, ruling in which the Supreme Court overturned Roe v. Wade, Warren wrote a New York Times op-ed requesting that President Biden unblock "critical resources and authority that states and the federal government can use to meet the surge in demand for reproductive health services".

On March 13, 2023, Warren presented a detailed analysis of the collapse of Silicon Valley Bank on March 10, 2023, and provided possible solutions to avoid further bank failures, in The New York Times.

Public image

Ancestry and Native American issues
According to Warren and her brothers, older family members told them during their childhood that they had some Native American ancestry. In 2012, she said that "being Native American has been part of my story, I guess, since the day I was born". In 1984, Warren contributed recipes to a Native American cookbook and identified herself as Cherokee.

During Warren's first Senate race in 2012, her opponent, Scott Brown, speculated that she had fabricated Native ancestry to gain advantage on the employment market and used Warren's ancestry in several attack ads. Warren has denied that her alleged heritage gave her any advantages in her schooling or her career. Several colleagues and employers (including Harvard) have said her reported ethnic status played no role in her hiring. From 1995 to 2004, her employer, Harvard Law School, listed her as a Native American in its federal affirmative action forms; Warren later said she was unaware of this.

The Washington Post reported that in 1986, Warren identified her race as "American Indian" on a State Bar of Texas write-in form used for statistical information gathering, but added that there was "no indication it was used for professional advancement". A 2018 Boston Globe investigation found that her reported ethnicity played no role in her rise in the academic legal profession, and concluded there was "clear evidence, in documents and interviews, that her claim to Native American ethnicity was never considered by the Harvard Law faculty, which voted resoundingly to hire her, or by those who hired her to four prior positions at other law schools", and that "Warren was viewed as a white woman by the hiring committees at every institution that employed her". In February 2019, Warren apologized for having identified as Native American.

Throughout his presidency, former president Donald Trump mocked Warren for her assertions of Native American ancestry, and pejoratively called her "Pocahontas". At a July 2018 Montana rally, he promised that if he debated Warren, he would pay $1 million to her favorite charity if she took a DNA test and "it shows you're an Indian". In October 2018, Warren released an analysis of a DNA test by geneticist Carlos D. Bustamante that found her ancestry to be mostly European but "strongly support[ed] the existence of an unadmixed Native American ancestor", likely "in the range of 6 to 10 generations ago". Other geneticists, while not disputing the test's validity, found the underlying science "flawed" due to the lack of Native Americans in the United States in the database. Geneticists Krystal Tsosie and Matthew Anderson called the interpretation of the test "problematic", citing, among other reasons, "Warren’s motives, and the genetic variants informing the comparison". They added: "because Bustamante used Indigenous individuals from Central and South America as a reference group to compare Warren’s DNA, we believe he should have stated only that Warren potentially had an 'Indigenous' ancestor 6-10 generations ago, not conclusively a 'Native American' one. The distinction might seem hypercritical to most, but to the sovereign tribal nations of the United States it’s an important one." 

After publicizing Bustamante's interpretation of the test, Warren asked Trump to donate the money to the National Indigenous Women's Resource Center. Trump responded: "I didn't say that. I think you better read it again". The Cherokee Nation called the use of DNA testing to determine Native American heritage "inappropriate and wrong". According to Politico, "Warren's past claims of American Indian ancestry garnered fierce criticism from both sides of the aisle", with "tribal leaders calling out Warren for claiming a heritage she did not culturally belong to."

During a January 2019 public appearance in Sioux City, Iowa, Warren was asked by an attendee, "Why did you undergo the DNA testing and give Donald more fodder to be a bully?" She responded in part, "I am not a person of color; I am not a citizen of a tribe. Tribal citizenship is very different from ancestry. Tribes, and only tribes, determine tribal citizenship, and I respect that difference." She later privately contacted leadership of the Cherokee Nation to apologize "for furthering confusion over issues of tribal sovereignty and citizenship and for any harm her announcement caused". Cherokee Nation executive director of communications Julie Hubbard said that Warren understands "that being a Cherokee Nation tribal citizen is rooted in centuries of culture and laws not through DNA tests". Warren apologized again in August 2019 before a Native American Forum in Iowa.

In February 2019, Warren received a standing ovation during a surprise visit to a Native American conference, where she was introduced by freshman Representative Deb Haaland (D-NM), one of the first two Native American women elected to the U.S. Congress. Haaland endorsed Warren for president in July 2019, calling her "a great partner for Indian Country".

Honors and awards

In 2009, The Boston Globe named Warren the Bostonian of the Year and the Women's Bar Association of Massachusetts honored her with the Lelia J. Robinson Award. The National Law Journal has repeatedly named Warren one of the Fifty Most Influential Women Attorneys in America, and in 2010 named her one of the 40 most influential attorneys of the decade. Also in 2009, Warren became the first professor in Harvard's history to win the law school's Sacks–Freund Teaching Award for a second time. In 2011, she delivered the commencement address at Rutgers Law School, her alma mater, and received an honorary Doctor of Laws degree and membership in the Order of the Coif. In 2011, Warren was inducted into the Oklahoma Hall of Fame. In January 2012, New Statesman magazine named her one of the "top 20 U.S. progressives". Warren was named one of Time magazine's 100 Most Influential People in the World in 2009, 2010, 2015, and 2017.

In 2018, the Women's History Month theme in the United States was "Nevertheless, She Persisted: Honoring Women Who Fight All Forms of Discrimination Against Women", referring to McConnell's remark about Warren.

In popular culture
 Warren has appeared in the documentary films Maxed Out (2007), Michael Moore's Capitalism: A Love Story (2009), Heist: Who Stole the American Dream? (2011), and Makers: Women Who Make America (2013).
 In 2017, Kate McKinnon played Warren on Saturday Night Live. McKinnon continued her impression of Warren in 2019 and 2020, during the 2020 Democratic Party presidential primaries. On the March 7, 2020, episode, Warren appeared as herself in the cold open alongside McKinnon's impression of her, and together they opened the show.
 In 2019, Warren wrote the entry on Alexandria Ocasio-Cortez for that year's Time 100.
 Warren's popularity is the basis of a wide array of merchandise sold in her name, much of which incorporates Mitch McConnell's remark "Nevertheless, she persisted", including an action figure of Warren.
 Musician Jonathan Mann has written songs about Warren, including "She Persisted".

Political protégés
Warren has mentored several people who have gone on to hold notable political office. U.S. Representative Katie Porter, a former law student of Warren's, is considered a protégée of Warren. Porter co-chaired Warren's presidential campaign. Another of Warren's political protégés is Boston Mayor Michelle Wu, who was a law student of Warren's and worked on her 2012 Senate campaign before running for Boston City Council herself in 2013. Suffolk County Sheriff Steven W. Tompkins got his start in politics working on Warren's 2012 Senate campaign. During his law school career, former U.S. Representative Joe Kennedy III considered Warren a mentor. A number of Warren acolytes serve in the Biden administration, including Bharat Ramamurti (a former economic policy advisor to Warren).

Books and other works
In 2004, Warren and her daughter, Amelia Tyagi, wrote The Two-Income Trap: Why Middle-Class Mothers and Fathers Are Going Broke. In the book they state that at that time, a fully employed worker earned less inflation-adjusted income than a fully employed worker had 30 years earlier. Although families spent less at that time on clothing, appliances, and other forms of consumption, the costs of core expenses such as mortgages, health care, transportation, and child care had increased dramatically. According to the authors, the result was that even families with two income earners were no longer able to save and incurred ever greater debt.

In an article in The New York Times, Jeff Madrick said of the book:

In 2005, Warren and David Himmelstein published a study on bankruptcy and medical bills that found that half of all families filing for bankruptcy did so in the aftermath of a serious medical problem. They say that three-quarters of such families had medical insurance. The study was widely cited in policy debates, but some have challenged its methods and offered alternative interpretations of the data, suggesting that only 17% of bankruptcies are directly attributable to medical expenses.

Metropolitan Books published Warren's book A Fighting Chance in April 2014. According to a Boston Globe review, "the book's title refers to a time she says is now gone, when even families of modest means who worked hard and played by the rules had at a fair shot at the American dream."

In April 2017, Warren published her 11th book, This Fight Is Our Fight: The Battle to Save America's Middle Class, in which she explores the plight of the American middle class and argues that the federal government needs to do more to help working families with stronger social programs and increased investment in education.

Publications

Selected articles
 
 
 
 
 
 
 
 
 

 Books
  (with Teresa A. Sullivan and Jay Westbrook)
  (with Teresa A. Sullivan and Jay Westbrook)
  (with Amelia Warren Tyagi)
  (with Amelia Warren Tyagi)
  (with Lynn M. LoPucki, Daniel Keating, Ronald Mann, and Normal Goldenberg)
  (with Jay Westbrook)
 
  (with Lynn M. LoPucki)

See also
 List of people who received an electoral vote in the United States Electoral College
 Progressivism in the United States
 Women in the United States Senate

References

Further reading

External links

 U.S. Senate website
 Campaign website

 
 
 Elizabeth Warren's file at Politifact
 
 Elizabeth Warren at On the Issues

 
1949 births
21st-century American politicians
21st-century American women politicians
American legal scholars
American Methodists
Methodists from Massachusetts
American people of English descent
American people of German descent
American women academics
American women lawyers
Articles containing video clips
Candidates in the 2020 United States presidential election
Democratic Party United States senators from Massachusetts
Fellows of the American Academy of Arts and Sciences
Female candidates for President of the United States
Female United States senators
Harvard Law School faculty
Living people
Massachusetts Democrats
Members of the American Law Institute
Northwest Classen High School alumni
People of the Consumer Financial Protection Bureau
Politicians from Cambridge, Massachusetts
Politicians from Oklahoma City
Progressivism in the United States
Rutgers School of Law–Newark alumni
Rutgers School of Law–Newark faculty
University of Houston alumni
University of Houston faculty
University of Michigan Law School faculty
University of Pennsylvania Law School faculty
University of Texas School of Law faculty
American women legal scholars
Competitive debaters
Native American-related controversies